The large moth subfamily Lymantriinae contains the following genera beginning with R:

References 

Lymantriinae
Lymantriid genera R